Russia women's national floorball team is the national floorball team of Russia. , the team was ranked fourteenth by the International Floorball Federation.

References 

Women's national under-19 floorball teams
Floorball